Bossavirus is a genus of viruses in the subfamily Gammaherpesvirinae, in the family Herpesviridae, in the order Herpesvirales. It contains the sole species Delphinid gammaherpesvirus 1.

References 

Gammaherpesvirinae
Virus genera